Lotta Comunista (Communist Struggle) or Gruppi Leninisti della Sinistra Comunista (Leninist Groups of Left Communism) is a political party born in Italy that does not recognize parliamentary dynamics for the party's strategy in the current historical period, and thus describes itself as extra-parliamentary. It is a revolutionary and internationalist party founded by Arrigo Cervetto and Lorenzo Parodi in 1965 and inspired by the theory and practice of Marx, Engels, and Lenin.

History 
The origins of this organization go back to the 1950s, when some former partisans of GAAP (Anarchist Groups of Proletarian Action) who supported the FCL (Libertarian Communist Federation) and who were subsequently expelled from FAI (Italian Anarchist Federation) because they became Leninists, later joined the group called Azione Comunista. It had been expelled from the Italian Communist Party (PCI) as a result of the position it had taken in favor of the 1956 Hungarian insurgents, who were harshly repressed by the Soviets. Stalinism was defined as the reactionary policy of the counterrevolution after the death of Lenin. The group also protested against the positions of the Italian Communist Party, considered dependent on the Communist Party of the Soviet Union (CPSU) and dominated by the foreign policy of the USSR. It was also considered in collaboration with Italian capitalism. This situation would have strengthened the geopolitical structure that was emerging and so would have prevented the emergence and development of Marxist and internationalist forces.

Political practice 
In 1965, after a phase of theoretical clarification within the group, it assumed the name of Lotta Comunista and continued the line of abstention strategy against the participation of the party in elections and to what is defined as "bourgeois parliamentary democracy."

Unlike other extra-parliamentary groups, Lotta Comunista has never implemented or supported forms of armed struggle, even during the 1960s and 1970s. The party thinks that a revolution cannot take place if an ideology is not well-established locally, nationally, and internationally; otherwise, the revolution will degenerate into state capitalism like Stalinism or a social democracy. So it is devoted only to peaceful propaganda of Marxist ideas, waiting for an event of global reach, like a world war, to start a revolution. 

The party's goal is to take root at the organizational level in neighborhoods, factories, and universities of some European countries to ensure that a significant proportion of the European working class, shortly, can be found in the Leninist party. It will be a reference and a guide on facing the gigantic upheavals that capitalism is leading worldwide. According to Lotta Comunista's thesis (taken directly from Marx), capitalism cannot maintain world order. According to these claims, the capitalist production system throws world society into a situation of chaos on a cyclical basis. It creates armed conflict to redefine the market. In turn, the general crisis of capitalism gives communists the opportunity to exploit the wars generated by capitalism to promote the proletarian revolution. On this aspect, the thesis of Lotta Comunista refers to the teachings of Lenin outlined in his April Theses.

State capitalism in East Europe, Asia, and other places 
One of the fundamental points of Lotta Comunista's policy is the so-called "correct and consistent application of Marxism."

Lotta Comunista has always rejected the idea that the Soviet Union, in its satellite countries and Asia, had achieved a form of communism or socialism. Instead, after Lenin's death, they think that the Soviet Union had taken shape as a true aristocracy of bureaucrats constituting a form of capitalism directed and controlled by the ruling political class or state capitalism.

Stalin also betrayed the revolution not only by highlighting his power but also by theorizing the possibility of the development of a communist system in a single country in a world dominated by capitalist powers (the theory of socialism in one country), contrary to what was said by Lenin and Marxists in general. Historiography indicates Lenin as the source of this internationalist concept. Indeed, the definition coined by Stalin to the Congress of the CPSU in 1923 happened when Lenin was significantly weakened by disease and unable to communicate. In this case, the version of paternity Stalinist historiography remains the most reliable. The featured characteristic of state capitalism created by Stalin, over the savagery in the repression and espionage (particularly against the Bolsheviks' critics of Stalinist policy), was the autarchic closure that he justified by theorizing an imaginary division of the world market into two blocks. Guido La Barbera, one of the current leaders of Lotta Comunista, said that Stalinism overcame an inherent weakness and chronic capital investing in war and heavy industry and not in developing economic and social infrastructure.

Commemoration of the October Revolution and 1 May 
On 7 November of each year, Lotta Comunista celebrates the anniversary of the October Revolution. On May 1, defined by Lotta Comunista not as "Labor Day" but as a day of the international struggle of workers, Lotta Comunista celebrates the "Internationalist First of May" (Primo Maggio Internazionalista) with demonstrations (in Genoa, Milan, Turin, and Brescia among other cities) and initiatives in the cities where it is present as an organized political party.

Localization 
The headquarters of Lotta Comunista are historically located in Genoa, but the party operates in industrial cities (the clubs of Milan, Turin, and Rome are very active) and it also opened several clubs abroad, particularly in France, Russia, Spain, Germany, Britain, Greece, and Brazil. The purpose of Lotta Comunista is to entrench a Leninist party in some locales of key European cities, such as the Italian industrial triangle and the Ile de France in Paris. Lotta Comunista publishes and disseminates the namesake monthly, founded in 1965, which is entirely self-financed. Lotta Comunista Editions collects, publishes, and reproduces material produced since 1950 in the Italian, French, English, Spanish, Portuguese, German, Russian, and Greek languages.

The organization is among the strongest extra-parliamentary formations in Italy, with about 40,000 copies of its Lotta Comunista publication sold house by house by its activists each month. Currently it is active in cities such as: Genoa, Milan, Pavia, Turin, London, Paris, Nice, Rome, Parma, Savona, Brescia, Bergamo, Padua, Verona, Bologna, Florence, Pisa, Naples, Udine, St. Petersburg, Athens, Rio de Janeiro, Bari, Brindisi, Lecce, Valencia, London, and Berlin.

Editions Marxist Science 
Lotta Comunista has another publisher based in Pris, Science Marxist, which publishes books in European languages: French, Greek, English, Russian, Portuguese, German, and Spanish.

Editions Pantarei 
Lotta Comunista publishes Italian texts that address the deepening and the history of the labor movement. Editions Pantarei also republishes essential texts such as the History of the Italian Communist Party by Giorgio Galli.

Institute of Studies on Capitalism 
In Genoa, Lotta Comunista established the Institute for the Study of Capitalism, with an extensive library including documents represented in several publications of the "Edizioni Panta Rei."

Sergio Motosi Institute 
In honor of the militant Sergio Motosi, who died in 2002, Lotta Comunista founded the Sergio Motosi Institute for the Study of International Workers' Movement in 2005. Its goal is to deepen the study of the history of the labor movement around the world.

NGO Center for International Studies "Noviy Prometey" 
Lotta Comunista has created an NGO in Russia: the Centre for International Studies Noviy Prometey, which deals with the publication and dissemination of the Bulletin Internationalist and books by the group translated into Russian. It also offers courses on Marxism, as it does in Italy and France.

See also 

 Amadeo Bordiga
 Arrigo Cervetto
 Left communism
 Leninism
 Marxism

Anti-Stalinist left
Left communism
Communist parties in Italy
Far-left politics in Italy
 Political parties established in 1965